Manala may refer to:

Manala, Benin
Manala, eighth full-length album by Finnish folk metal band Korpiklaani, released in 2012
Another name for Tuonela, the underworld in Finnish and Estonian mythologies

See also
Mannala, a brioche baked in France for Saint Nicholas Day